The 1889 Kentucky Derby was the 15th running of the Kentucky Derby. The race took place on May 9, 1889.

Full results

 Winning Breeder: Noah Armstrong; (MT)

Payout

 The winner received a purse of $4,880.
 Second place received $300.
 Third place received $150.

References

1889
Kentucky Derby
Derby
May 1889 sports events
1889 in American sports